Frank Tiguer Welch (August 10, 1897 – July 25, 1957) was an outfielder in Major League Baseball who played from  through  for the Philadelphia Athletics (1919–1926) and Boston Red Sox (1927). Listed at 5' 9", 175 lb., Welch batted and threw right-handed. He was born in Birmingham, Alabama. 
 
In a nine-season career, Welch was a .274 hitter (634-for-2310) with 41 home runs and 295 RBI in 738 games, including 310 runs, 100 doubles, 31 triples, 18 stolen bases, and a .350 on-base percentage.  On October 1, 1921, Welch became the last person to hit a home run off Babe Ruth in a major league game; the homer was the 10th and last the Babe would ever allow as a pitcher.

Welch died at the age of 59 in his hometown of Birmingham, Alabama.

External links

Retrosheet

Boston Red Sox players
Philadelphia Athletics players
Major League Baseball outfielders
Macon Tigers players
Baseball players from Birmingham, Alabama
1897 births
1957 deaths